Mateen Stewart is an  American stand-up comedian and actor.

Life and career
Stewart was born and raised in Detroit, Michigan. He attended Florida A&M University, where he majored in theater. He has appeared on screens with Ben Stiller and Ken Marino and also played the token "Black Guy" in a National McDonald’s commercial. He appeared on Jimmy Kimmel Live! and Last Week Tonight with John Oliver.

Filmography

Television

References

External links
 

Living people
American stand-up comedians
21st-century American comedians
Year of birth missing (living people)
American television actors